Ribnik may refer to:

Settlement
Ribnik, Bosnia and Herzegovina
Ribnik, Croatia
Ribnik, Bulgaria
Ribnik (Jagodina), a village in the municipality of Jagodina, Serbia
Ribnik, Semič, a remote abandoned settlement in the Municipality of Semič in southern Slovenia

River
Ribnik (river) in Bosnia.
Erenik, or the Ribnik River in Kosovo.